The Battle of the Save was fought in 388 between the forces of Roman usurper Magnus Maximus and the Eastern Roman Empire. Emperor Theodosius I defeated Magnus Maximus's army in battle. Later Maximus was captured and executed at Aquileia.

Background 
Valentinian I, after his death, in 375, was succeeded in the west jointly by his sons, Gratian and Valentinian II. Gratian, who was 17 years old at his accession, began his rule well, subduing the Alemans in a hard-fought campaign beyond the Rhine in 377 and reacting with foresight and prudence to the death of his uncle Valens at the battle of Adrianople, appointing Theodosius I, a skillful commander, with the authority of Augustus to contain the Gothic irruption. Gratian, however, soon alienated his western subjects by his disgraceful favoritism towards his Scythian bodyguards, and his neglect of public business, with the result that in 383 the British legions rebelled, and proclaimed emperor Magnus Maximus. Maximus shortly invaded Gaul and deposed and killed Gratian, meeting little or no resistance from Gratian's disaffected subjects. Theodosius, Gratian's appointee in the east, was now faced with the choice between ingratitude to his murdered co-Augustus and a civil war which might, given the barbarian menace, bring the empire to final destruction. He chose to accept Maximus as emperor in the west, with the sole stipulation that young Valentinian II, (represented, for reason of his extreme youth, by his mother Justina) be permitted to rule as an independent third Augustus in Italy; Maximus accepted, and war was for the time avoided.

Four years later (387), after Justina had alienated Italy by her Arianism and her religious conflicts with the popular bishop Ambrose of Milan, Maximus saw his opportunity to complete his usurpation of the west by conquering Italy from the 16 year-old Valentinian. To effect this most easily, he employed the pretense of reinforcing the Rhaetian frontier against the barbarians to introduce his troops over the Alps into Italy, after which, with the passes secure behind him, he treacherously turned to march on Milan, Valentinian's capital. Justina and her son only escaped by a frantic flight to Aquileia, whence they proceeded by boat to Thessalonica, entrusting themselves to Theodosius' magnanimity; in the meantime, Italy succumbed to Maximus.

The Battle 
Theodosius at once departed from Constantinople to greet the imperial fugitives at Thessalonica. According to Gibbon, Theodosius hesitated some time whether to risk a war against the usurper with his formidable Germanic auxiliaries, but was ultimately swayed by his love for Valentinian's sister, Galla, to take up the fallen family's cause. Justina only too gladly consented to Theodosius' marriage with her daughter, and after a hurried ceremony, Theodosius set himself to begin the war against Maximus.

The latter, in the meantime, after besieging Aemona on the frontiers of Italy and Illyricum, had advanced to occupy Siscia, thinking to repel Theodosius on the Save river. During his years as emperor of the west he had, as previously intimated, amassed a powerful force of German mercenaries, in addition to which he had the entire forces of Gaul, Britain, and Spain at his disposal. Theodosius I, on the other hand, possessed the superiority of naval power, the alliance of approximately 40,000 Gothic Foederati (lately settled in Thrace and Asia-Minor at the end of the Gothic war), and a strong body of Huns and Alani as auxiliaries.

Whichever side, however, possessed the material advantage, the superiority of generalship was decisive. While Maximus delayed in apprehension, Theodosius, spreading rumors of an impending invasion of Italy from the sea, boldly advanced through Illyricum with his main army, at the same time sending his Frankish lieutenant Arbogastes further north through Rhaetia along the Danube into Gaul.

The entire campaign, culminating in the battle on the Sava river near Siscia, was over within two months. On the very day that Theodosius reached the Save he forced the passage against Maximus' superior forces on the opposite bank. The following day, Maximus' lieutenant (and brother) Marcellinus launched a counter-attack to hurl Theodosius back into the river, and the fighting lasted the whole day. Ultimately, Maximus's army was routed, and he fled to Aquileia, an important fortress west of the Julian Alps, where he took refuge.

Theodosius pursued him and besieged Aquileia. The garrison soon surrendered, delivering Maximus in chains to the axe of Theodosius' justice. The deaths of Maximus (August 28), and of his son Victor (captured and executed by Arbogastes), brought the civil war to a swift conclusion.

References
Schmid, Walter; Emona, Vienna 1913 
The History of the Decline and Fall of The Roman Empire by Edward Gibbon
For more sources see talk page

388
Save
Save 388
Croatia in the Roman era
380s in the Roman Empire
Theodosius I